Rodolfo Irias Navas (born 25 October 1949 in La Ceiba) is a Honduran politician; he currently acts as deputy of the National Congress of Honduras representing the National Party for Atlántida since 1986.

In 1990, after being elected, he took office as President of the National Congress of Honduras from 1990 until 1994.

References

1949 births
Living people
People from La Ceiba
Presidents of the National Congress of Honduras
Deputies of the National Congress of Honduras
National Party of Honduras politicians